On 11–12 June 2021, a massacre occurred in Zurmi, Zamfara State, Nigeria. The attack was part of a broader conflict in the region between government and armed bandits.

On 11 and 12 June 2021, a group of gunmen on motorcycles attacked the villages of Kadawa, Kwata, Maduba, Ganda Samu, Saulawa and Askawa in the Zurmi local government area of Zamfara State in northwestern Nigeria, killing 53. Most of the victims were farmers who were shot while they worked in the fields.

Aftermath 
Once the massacre had ended, all 53 bodies had been discovered and given proper burials. Police were deployed in the region to prevent further mass killings from occurring.

References

2021 murders in Nigeria
2021 mass shootings in Africa
2020s massacres in Nigeria
21st century in Zamfara State

June 2021 crimes in Africa
Mass shootings in Nigeria
Massacres in 2021